Pine Rivers State High School is a government state secondary school in the suburb of Strathpine, Moreton Bay Region, Queensland, Australia.

First opened in 1964, Pine Rivers High School is a large school.

Principals 
Pine Rivers State High School has had six principals in its 52-year history. Graham James Sprott was the longest-reigning principal of Pine Rivers High School - leading the school for 21 years.

Leaderbody 
In addition to staff leadership, senior students have the opportunity to elect for representation within the school leaderbody. These positions bring responsibility and power as those whom hold positions can enact change within the school community. Members of the student leadership team are divided into Captains and Student Representative Council Executive.

2016 Pine Rivers State High School leaderbody

Captaincy
Four Year 11 students are announced at the Year 12 Valedictory to transition into leadership roles the following year. The role of the school captains is to represent the school at events, ceremonies, and special occasions. Within the school community, captains work alongside the Student Representative Council Executive to conduct change within the school. The captain position is highly sought after due to it being viewed in high esteem.

Student Representative Council Executive 
The Student Representative Council is the major committee which allows students of Pine Rivers to voice their concerns and opinions on school matters. This council is chaired by three senior students who are elected by staff and their peers and announced alongside the captains during the Year 12 Valedictory ceremony.

Sporting houses 
Prior 2007, Pine Rivers High School was split into four sporting houses: Kulukan, Kuran, Tjingilli and Wandajina. Upon enrolment of the school, students were put into these houses - each of which were allocated a colour that the students could choose to wear on sporting occasions, including swimming carnivals and athletics days. 

In 2007, a choice was made to abandon the previous system of houses and split the school cohort into two sporting houses. All students (and teachers) with a surname ranging from 'A' to 'L' were assigned to the 'Pine Panthers', whereas 'M' to 'Z' were allocated to the 'Rivers Rhinos'.

Publications

Rivers Review 
Pine Rivers High School releases a fortnightly newsletter to the school community titled "Rivers Review". The newsletter contains brief summaries of student achievements in the two weeks, in addition to notifying parents on upcoming events, important happenings and reminders.

PRISM 
Pine Rivers also releases an annual yearbook, entitled "PRISM". This magazine is a free yearbook available to the students and teachers at the conclusion of the school year and includes photos of various school events, list of annual highlights, achievements and a complete record of the student and teacher cohort. Previously, the publication has been compiled and designed by a class of Year 12 Senior Students known as the 'PRISM Committee', however since 2015 the magazine has been formed by a group of older students and teachers, most notably a Year 10 Information Communication and Technology class.

Events
Pine Rivers High School has an extensive background in both communal and school-based events. The various causes of the events range from the general enjoyment of students to showcasing the school to the public. The school also promotes various public events including Harmony Day, Anzac Day and NAIDOC Week.

EXPO
The school hosts an annual expo, which primarily serves as a way of showcasing the school to the public. Members of the general public, typically graduates from primary schools, attend the EXPO to gain a general feel of the school's atmosphere, and can sample different activities available from the school curriculum. Traditionally, EXPO showcases aspects of departments including the school's multi award-winning performing arts program. Typically, the performances include the String Ensemble, Concert Band and Stage Band, and the various dance squads the school offers.

Musical
For 40 consecutive years, Pine Rivers State High School has annually staged a musical theatre production. While the production is decided by the members of Performing Arts staff, the musical includes members of the school's students. After a vigorous creation period, the musical is performed to paying members of the general public. Pine Rivers' annual musical is held around the months of March–May, and is performed over a 3-day period of Wednesday, Friday and Saturday on its respective week, with a Matinée for local primary schools to view the Musical on Tuesday morning. The school boasts the reputation of never performing the same musical twice, and celebrated its unique performance standard in 2006 by staging a remake of the 'Wizard of Oz', entitled 'The Wiz', to commemorate its original performance years earlier. The musicals vary in theme, with the most recent, 40th production, being a rendition of Little Shop of Horrors.

On 2 September 2016 Pine Rivers State High School announced that the 41st annual musical, would be Disney's "The Little Mermaid" which was performed in late April 2017.

Full list of Pine Rivers State High School musicals

Walkathon
The school's major fundraiser, the walkathon is a sporting/social event in which students walk from the school to Pine Rivers Park, Strathpine. Although optional, enthusiastic participation of the students typically results in a dress up to suit a certain theme that the students have selected. Throughout the years the themes have had extreme variations, from the "Mad Hatter's Derby Day" to "Sparrow Invades Neverland" to even "favorite meme", whereas in recent years the school has adopted themes such as "Heroes and Villains", Disney and "Myths and Legends". Most recently, the theme was "When I Grow Up", encouraging the school community to dress up in the outfits of their dream career as a child.

Notable alumni

Brenden Hall (Australian Paralympic Swimmer)
Jessicah Schipper (Australian Olympic Swimmer)
Liam De Young (Australian Olympic Hockey Team)
Cameron Smith (golfer) (born 1993)
Annette Shun Wah (Australian TV and radio presenter, producer)
Will Elliott (Australian author) (born 1979)
Bianca Beetson (contemporary Indigenous Artist and activist)
Tyson Gamble (Brisbane Broncos) (born 1996)

See also 
List of schools in Queensland
Education in Australia

References

External links
 Official website

Public high schools in Queensland
Schools in South East Queensland
Educational institutions established in 1964
1964 establishments in Australia